Beau McCreery (born 19 April 2001) is an Australian rules footballer playing for the Collingwood Football Club in the Australian Football League (AFL).

State football
McCreery began playing football at under-8 level with Southern Football League club Cove, where he played for 10 years before being invited to try out for South Australia National Football League (SANFL) club South Adelaide. He played for South Australia's junior side in the Torrens University Cup, being nominated for the most valuable player (MVP) award in round 1, after kicking seven goals and laying 11 tackles in their victory over Central District. He debuted for South Adelaide's senior side against Woodville-West Torrens at Adelaide Oval in June 2020. He kicked two goals on debut, including the match-winner. Later in the season, he performed consistently, kicking goals in all of the games in his first season apart from three.

AFL career
McCreery was drafted by Collingwood with their last pick of the 2020 national draft, which was the 44th pick overall. He made his official debut against Brisbane Lions in the third round of the 2021 AFL season as a medical sub. After not taking part in the game, he took part for the first time the following week, against Greater Western Sydney, scoring a goal in the opening minutes of the match with his first kick. He also applied pressure, laying eight tackles, with seven of them inside-50.

Personal life
McCreery worked as a carpenter after leaving school at the age of 17. He grew up a Port Adelaide fan.

Statistics
Updated to the end of the 2022 season.

|-
| 2021 ||  || 31
| 13 || 11 || 6 || 52 || 30 || 82 || 24 || 43 || 0.8 || 0.5 || 4.0 || 2.3 || 6.3 || 1.8 || 3.3 
|-
| 2022 ||  || 31
| 22 || 14 || 11 || 115 || 89 || 204 || 34 || 86 || 0.6 || 0.5 || 5.2 || 4.0 || 9.3 || 1.5 || 3.9 
|- class=sortbottom
! colspan=3 | Career
! 35 !! 25 !! 17 !! 167 !! 119 !! 286 !! 58 !! 129 !! 0.7 !! 0.5 !! 4.8 !! 3.4 !! 8.2 !! 1.7 !! 3.7
|}

References

External links

Living people
2001 births
Collingwood Football Club players
South Adelaide Football Club players
Australian rules footballers from South Australia